I Have Honor is a political alliance in Armenia. It was founded on 15 May 2021 and consists of the Republican Party of Armenia and the Homeland Party.

History
The alliance was formed during the 2020–2021 Armenian protests. Both the Republican Party and the Homeland Party were previous members of the Homeland Salvation Movement and called on Prime Minister Nikol Pashinyan to resign following Armenia's defeat in the 2020 Nagorno-Karabakh war. Both parties subsequently left the Homeland Salvation Movement to form the I Have Honor alliance.

The alliance had confirmed that they would participate in the 2021 Armenian parliamentary elections. Artur Vanetsyan was nominated to lead the alliance. Following the election, the alliance won 5.22% of the popular vote, gaining 6 seats in the National Assembly.

On 21 June 2022, Artur Vanetsyan announced that he was withdrawing the Homeland Party from the I Have Honor alliance, effectively dissolving the alliance.

Ideology
The alliance identifies itself as national conservative and supports the strengthening of the military of Armenia, developing the economy, supporting the activities of the Armenian Apostolic Church, and ensuring the self-determination of Artsakh.

Leadership
 Serzh Sargsyan, former Prime Minister and President of Armenia
 Artur Vanetsyan, Chairman of the Homeland Party (resigned from the alliance on 21 June 2022)

Electoral record

Parliamentary elections

See also

 Programs of political parties in Armenia

References

External links 
 I Have Honor on Facebook

Political parties established in 2021
Political parties in Armenia
Political party alliances in Armenia
Conservative parties in Armenia
2021 establishments in Armenia